Nabagram is a village in Kumarganj, Balurghat subdivision, Dakshin Dinajpur district, West Bengal, India.  This village is located at east-north of Dakshin Dinajpur district (India Bangladesh border).

Villages in Dakshin Dinajpur district